Bang Pa-in Ayutthaya Football Club is a Thai professional Association football club based in Bang Pa-in, Phra Nakhon Si Ayutthaya Province. The club is currently playing in the Thailand Amateur League Western region.

Timeline

History of events of Ayutthaya Football Club:

Crest history
The club was renamed to Bang Pa-in Ayutthaya and add the texts Bang Pa-in in 2020.

Honours

Regional League Division 2:
Winner: (2012)

Regional League Central-East Division:
Winner: (2012)
Runner up: (2009)

Stadium and locations

Seasons

P = Played
W = Games won
D = Games drawn
L = Games lost
F = Goals for
A = Goals against
Pts = Points
Pos = Final position

TPL = Thai Premier League

QR1 = First qualifying round
QR2 = Second qualifying round
QR3 = Third qualifying round
QR4 = Fourth qualifying round
RInt = Intermediate round
R1 = Round 1
R2 = Round 2
R3 = Round 3

R4 = Round 4
R5 = Round 5
R6 = Round 6
GR = Group stage
QF = Quarter-finals
SF = Semi-finals
RU = Runners-up
S = Shared
W = Winners

Players

Current squad

References

External links
 Official Website of Ayutthaya FC
 Official Facebook

Association football clubs established in 2009
Football clubs in Thailand
Phra Nakhon Si Ayutthaya province
2009 establishments in Thailand
Bang Pa-in Ayutthaya F.C.